István Marton (21 June 1943 – 19 April 2015) was a Hungarian politician, who served as Mayor of Nagykanizsa from 2006 to 2010.

Marton became an independent mayor with the support of Fidesz. His relation with the deputy mayor Péter Cseresnyés decayed and the Fidesz withdrew confidence from the mayor. However Marton and two other municipal representatives left the Fidesz party and founded Civic Association for Nagykanizsa (KKE). The Fidesz group lost its majority in the General Assembly. Cseresnyés became Mayor of Nagykanizsa as candidate of Fidesz in 2010. István Marton (KKE) came to second place with 19,91%.

References

1943 births
2015 deaths
Fidesz politicians
Mayors of places in Hungary
People from Celldömölk